A loyalty program is a marketing strategy designed to encourage customers to continue to shop at or use the services of a business associated with the program. Today, such programs cover most types of commerce, each having varying features and rewards schemes, including in banking, entertainment, hospitality, retailing and travel. The market approach has shifted from product-centric to a customer-centric one due to a highly competitive market and a wide array of services offered to customers, therefore, it's important that marketing strategies prioritize growing a sustainable business and increasing customer satisfaction.

A loyalty program typically involves the operator of a particular program set up an account for a customer of a business associated with the scheme, and then issue to the customer a loyalty card (variously called rewards card, points card, advantage card, club card, or some other name) which may be a plastic or paper card, visually similar to a credit card, that identifies the cardholder as a participant in the program. Cards may have a barcode or magstripe to more easily allow for scanning, although some are chip cards or proximity cards.

By presenting a card, customers typically receive either a discount on the current purchase or an allotment of points that they can use for future purchases. Hence, the card is the visible means of implementing a type of what economists call a two-part tariff. Application forms for cards usually entail agreements by the store concerning customer privacy, typically non-disclosure (by the store) of non-aggregate data about customers. The store uses aggregate data internally (and sometimes externally) as part of its marketing research. Over time the data can reveal, for example, a given customer's favorite brand of beer, or whether they are a vegetarian. Where a customer has provided sufficient identifying information, the loyalty card may also be used to access such information to expedite verification during receipt of cheques or dispensing medical prescription preparations, or for other membership privileges such as access to an airport lounge using a frequent-flyer card. In recent years, businesses now offer these loyalty cards in the form of a loyalty app, which means users are less likely to lose their cards. Almost all major casino chains also have loyalty cards, which offer members tier credits, reward credits, comps, and other perks based on card members' "theo" from gambling, various demographic data, and spend patterns on various purchases at the casino, within the casino network, and with the casino's partners. Examples of such programs include Caesars Rewards (formerly called Total Rewards) and MGM Resorts International's Mlife.

Loyalty programs have been described as a form of centralized virtual currency, one with unidirectional cash flow, since reward points can be exchanged into a good or service but not into cash.

History

Betty Crocker's loyalty points program, introduced 1929, ended in 2006, one of the longest running loyalty programs.

By continent and country

Asia
 Hong Kong: Octopus Rewards, MTR Corporation. Different chain stores under common ownership often share the same loyalty program, such as A.S. Watson Group's MoneyBack, which can be used at Parknshop, Watsons, and Fortress stores, as well as the corporation's retail partners. HKT's The Club also offers a similar loyalty program. Flag airline carrier Cathay Pacific operates Asia Miles, a loyalty and frequent-flyer program.
 India: PAYBACK India is India's largest coalition loyalty program. German loyalty program operator Loyalty Partner took a controlling interest in i-mint in June 2010 and renamed the program PAYBACK India in July 2011. BPCL's PetroBonus fuel card program has 2 million members. Indian Oil's fleet card program XTRAPOWER and retail program XTRAREWARDS claim a combined customer base of 3 million.
 Iran: The first Iranian loyalty program launched in 1996. East Credit Card Group Kish launched its loyalty program in 2005.
 Malaysia: Genting Highlands Resort loyalty card, WorldCard, is valid in three countries: Malaysia, Singapore and Hong Kong. 
 Philippines: SM Supermalls and BDO Unibank offer rewards cards which are accepted by The SM Store, SM Supermarket, SM Hypermarket, ACE Hardware and Watsons Pharmacy. Robinsons Malls also offers a loyalty program through the Go Rewards app (formerly known as the Robinsons Rewards card). Others are Jollibee, (HappyPlus card), and Mercury Drug's Suki Card.
 Singapore: Loyalty programs in Singapore include GrabRewards by Grab, SAFRA and Plus! from NTUC.
 UAE: Yegertek UAE [Funded By NB Ventures] has various type of loyalty program and also gives Microsoft engage 365 solution form 2018. with Malta business ecabs circle celebrates 70,000 members.

Europe
 Austria: The two largest loyalty programs in Austria are Payback and mo. JÖ was fully launched in 2019.
 Finland: The two major retail coalitions with loyalty programs are the S-Group with their S-Etukortti card) and Kesko with K-Plussa (67%).
 Georgia: Georgia's biggest loyalty card program has been run by Universal Card Corporation since 2010 via UNICARD.
 Germany: The largest loyalty program is Payback, launched in 2000.  and the Shell ClubSmart program are next in size.  was launched by Arvato in 2008. HappyDigits was disbanded by 2010.
 Hungary: SuperShop and Multipoint are their main loyalty programs.
 Italy: After the exit of Nectar from the market in 2015, Payback is the most popular loyalty program. Supermarkets Esselunga, Coop and Il Gigante also have loyalty programs.
 Latvia: One of the largest loyalty programs in Latvia which is working as an operator for many merchants is Pins. Another is Walmoo
 Norway: The largest Norwegian loyalty program is Trumf. Trumf is a «brick and mortar» loyalty program owned by NorgesGruppen, a grocery wholesaling group in Norway. KickBack.no is one of the largest online loyalty programs and cashback sites in Norway. KickBack.no is owned by Schibsted Media Group.
 Republic of Ireland: Superquinn introduced its SuperClub loyalty card in 1993, the prototype for Europe. However, loyalty cards did not expand until 1997, when Tesco Ireland introduced its Clubcard scheme, shortly after its purchase of Power Supermarkets. SuperValu introduced their own loyalty club called Real Rewards. Others were: 
 During the late 1990s—Esso petrol program were: Tiger Miles, Maxol, Texaco and Statoil. Increasing oil prices ended these in 2005.
 Game, a major computer game and hardware retailer, which merged with Electronics Boutique's programme.
 Rewards From Us To You, a hotel loyalty program
 Russia: MALINA, "the largest multicorporate customer loyalty program in Russia," was launched in 2006 by Loyalty Partners Vostok. Another is Mnogo.ru.
 Switzerland: Loyalty programs are popular in Switzerland, with the two main supermarket chains, Migros and Coop prominent.  The M-Cumulus card can be used at the Migros supermarkets, Ex Libris, SportXX, and other retailers. The Coop Supercard earns points on purchases at Coop and a variety of other associated stores. Other stores such as Interio, a furniture retailer, are also joining the market with loyalty cards and store-based incentivized credit cards.  The only coalition loyalty scheme in Switzerland is Bonus Card with a network of over 300 independent retail partners. In recent years, online loyalty programs have also started to target the Swiss. First to make an offering in Switzerland was German-based Webmiles.  Claiming to be Switzerland's first online bonus program, Bonuspoints was launched in early 2008 and offers incentives for shopping at 70 different online stores.
 Turkey: Pegasus Airlines has a loyalty program called Pegasus Plus which gives rewards for every flight. Passengers can spend reward points as a discount without waiting to cover a full flight. Turkish Airlines has a loyalty program called Miles&Smiles.
 United Kingdom: Passcard (later renamed Passkey) was in the early 1980s. Sainsbury's Homebase Spend and Save Card was another early 1980s loyalty card. A later program, Tesco's ClubCard, was criticized for not offering value for money. The Economist suggested that the real benefit of loyalty cards to UK outlets is the massive marketing research database potential they offer. Morrisons is another program. Many stores have kiosks that, with the cards, print vouchers that can be used at the till.Safeway's ABC Card was discontinued in 2000. Maximiles is an online coalition program.Formerly operated by British Airways, Airmiles was the most popular flight-related loyalty program in the UK A re-brand of the program in 2011 from Airmiles to Avios caused controversy as members were now required to pay taxes and fees on flights they used for redemption.

Co-operative Membership: the Co-op Group offers a 2% (previously 5%) refund to members on Co-op branded products with 2% also going to the cardholder's nominated charity. This is only available in Co-op Group stores.  It replaced the dividend benefit previously used. Other Co-op chains continue with the dividend scheme, eg Midcounties Co-operative. Many of these accept other Co-operative loyalty cards but generally without the same benefits. For instance Midcounties Co-operative accept Co-operative Group cards but there is no charity donation or cardholder refund.

North America
 Canada: Canadian Tire's Canadian Tire money is the oldest loyalty program in Canada. Air Miles is Canada's largest loyalty program. The food and beverage industry also has several companies with rewards programs.
 United States: In the US, loyalty cards have a long history. Some are only online. Some partner with classic credit cards. Frequent-flyer programs and, less commonly SeaMiles co-exist with programs that donate a percentage of sales to a designated charity. Some American retailers either have not implemented these cards, or eliminated them, in favor of discounts for all shoppers. Few states regulate club cards. As an example, supermarkets in California are subject to the Supermarket Club Card Disclosure Act of 1999.
 Mexico: Bonvoy is a hotel-oriented loyalty program.

Oceania
Flybuys is the largest loyalty program in both Australia and New Zealand. 
 Australia: Contenders include Woolworths, Myer's MYER one program, the Priceline Club Card, Amcal Club, Millers Retail Club, and the BB Retail Capital Pulse Rewards program.
 New Zealand: Other programs include the New Zealand Automobile Association AA Smartfuel programme and Countdown supermarket's Onecard. Kachingo was a short-lived "card free" programme.

Mobile loyalty programs

Mobile online loyalty programs 
There has been a move away from traditional magnetic card, stamp, or punchcard based schemes to online and mobile online loyalty programs. While these schemes vary, the common element is a push toward eradication of a traditional card, in favour of an electronic equivalent. The choice of medium is often a QR code. Some prominent examples are Austrian based mobile-pocket established in 2009, the US-based Punchd (discontinued from June 2013,), which became part of Google in 2011. and an Australian-based loyalty card application called Stamp Me which incorporates iBeacon technology. Others, like Loopy Loyalty (HK), Loyalli (UK), Perka (US), and Whisqr Loyalty (CA), have offered similar programs. Passbook by Apple is the first attempt to standardize the format of mobile loyalty cards.

Mobile off-line loyalty programs
With the introduction of host card emulation (HCE) and near field communication (NFC) technology for mobile applications, traditional contactless smart cards for prepaid and loyalty programs are emulated in a smartphone. Google Wallet adopted these technologies for mobile off-line payment applications.

The major advantage of off-line over the online system is that the user's smartphone does not have to be online, and the transaction is fast. In addition, multiple emulated cards can be stored in a smartphone to support multi-merchant loyalty programs. Consequently, the user does not need to carry many physical cards anymore.

The term also is used regarding linking rewards for online and offline purchases.

Disloyalty cards
In three cities, some independent coffee shops have set up experimental 'disloyalty card' programs, which reward customers for visiting a variety of coffee shops.

Criticism
Evidence for the effectiveness of loyalty programs is controversial. Many companies are unsure whether and how to use customer loyalty programs profitably. Many programs (regardless of location, size, or industry) are run without the appropriate metrics or target parameters.

Some companies complain that loyalty programs discount goods to people who are buying goods anyway. Moreover, the expense of participating in these programs rarely generates a good return on investment. The Forte Consultancy Group regards loyalty programs as bribes. In the case of infrequent spenders, loyalty fees provide a means of subsidizing discounts.

A 2015 study found that most supermarket loyalty cards in the United States do not offer any real value to their customers. Furthermore, commercial use of customers' personal data – collected as part of loyalty programs – has the potential for abuse; it is highly likely that consumer purchases are tracked and used for marketing research to increase the efficiency of marketing and advertising, which is one of the purposes of offering the loyalty card. For some customers, participating in a loyalty program (even with a fake or anonymous card) funds activities that violate privacy. Consumers have also expressed concern about the integration of RFID technology into loyalty-card systems.

One may view loyalty and credit-card reward-plans as modern-day examples of kickbacks.
Employees who need to buy something (such as an airline flight or a hotel room) for a business trip, but who have discretion to decide which airline or hotel chain to use, have an incentive to choose the payment method that provides the most cash-back,
credit-card rewards or loyalty points instead of minimizing costs for their employer.

See also
 Geomarketing
 Identity management
 Incentive
 Incentive program
 Loyalty marketing
 Premium (marketing), e.g., "premiums"
 S&H Green Stamps
 Trading stamp

References

Pricing
 
Nudge theory